Tropicaliente was a Brazilian soap opera produced and displayed at the time of 18 hours by Rede Globo, ran from May 16 to December 31, 1994, totaling 194 chapters.

Written by Walter Negrao, in collaboration with Elizabeth Jhin, Angela Lamb, Mark Silver and directed by Vinicius Vianna and Blota Gonzaga, Marcelo Gomes and Roger Traverso. The general direction was Blota Gonzaga.

History

Synopsis
Ramiro is the leader of a fishing village in Fortaleza, Ceará. Married to Serena, the companion of all hours, the father of two children, Cassiano and Açucena . The guy is her boyfriend of Dalila, daughter of Ramiro's close friend, Samuel, also a fisherman, husband of Ester, who has another son, David, a young man who graduated doctor but is ashamed of his humble origins.

Letícia is the daughter of millionaire Gaspar Velazquez, a man who left the company in the hands of her daughter to enjoy life. At home, Letícia facing relationship problems with their children, Victor and Amanda. Widow and charming, she seeks a new direction for her love life. Suitors abound, as the gallant François, eyeing her beauty and fortune. To win her, he has the help of Franchico a tremendous pick with a mission: to join Letícia and François.

But Leticia is balanced with the reunion with Ramiro, the great passion of his life, which will trigger a series of conflicts, such as dating from Victor, the son of Leticia, a boy with serious psychological problems, with the sweet Açucena, the daughter of Ramiro.

Cast 

Supporting cast

 Flávio Galvão - Felipe
 Antônio Grassi - Conrado
 Bruno Giordano - Fisherman
 Jonas Bloch - Jordi (deceased husband of Letícia)
 Carolina Ferraz - Soraya Herzog

International broadcasters of Tropicaliente

Africa

Américas 

 : El Trece
 : Gamavisión
 : Las Estrellas
 : Telefuturo
 : Teledoce

Europe 

 : ORT

References

External links

1994 telenovelas
TV Globo telenovelas
Brazilian telenovelas
1994 Brazilian television series debuts
1994 Brazilian television series endings
Portuguese-language telenovelas